Teleperformance Albania (TP Albania) or officially Albania Marketing Service sh.p.k. (AMS) is an offshore business process outsourcing and contact center company in Albania. It is a subsidiary corporation of the Teleperformance Group.

Company profile
Teleperformance Albania was founded in 2008 to provide an offshore CRM (customer relationship management) solution for the Italian market. Teleperformance Albania started with an initial capacity of 100 workstations, and we grew exponentially by roughly doubling that number every six months. In 2014, TP Albania operates from two main sites: one in Tirana, counting more than 516 workstations, and a second one in Durrës, 40 km away, with about 749 workstations.

Locations
 Rruga Abdyl Frasheri, Hekla Center, Tirana
 Rruga Egnatia, Kristal Tower, Durrës

References

Business services companies established in 2008
Service companies of Albania
2008 establishments in Albania